Girl in a White Kimono is an 1894 oil painting by George Hendrik Breitner. The subject of the painting is the sixteen-year-old Geesje Kwak, of whom Breitner made a series of photographs and paintings wearing red and white kimono. The painting was inspired by the style of Japanese prints and is an example of Japonism. The painting is in the collection of the Rijksmuseum in Amsterdam.

References 

1894 paintings
Paintings in the collection of the Rijksmuseum
Japonisme
Paintings by George Hendrik Breitner